Gundala is a mandal of Bhadradri Kothagudem District of Telangana state in India. The headquarters of the sub-division are in the village of Gundala. The sub-division has 17 villages under its administration. Markode, Muthapuram and Lingagudem are the other populated regions in the mandal.

History
Kistapuram and Padugonigudem villages in Gundala Taluk of the district were rich in Megalithic cultural remnants explored and discovered recently.

Population
Gundala sub-division has a population of 23,817, while the village of Gundala has a population of 2,813 (2001 census)

Literacy
The subdivision has a literacy rate of 35.1%, while the village of Gundala has a literacy rate of 48.1% .(2001 census) The subdivision shows a low literacy rate as compared to the Khammam district's average.

Villages in Gundala mandal
Adavi Ramavaram 
Allapalle 
Ananthogu
Chinna Venkatapuram 
Damarathogu 
Dongathogu
Galaba 
Gundala 
Jagguthanda 
Kachanapalle
Konavarigudem 
Lingagudem 
Mamakannu
Markodu
Muthapuram 
Pedda Venkatapuram 
Ramanujagudem
Rayalankapadu 
Rayapadu
Sayanapalle 
Settipalle 
Tirlapuram

References

Mandals in Bhadradri Kothagudem district

nl:Gundala